J. S. Rajput is an Indian educationist, writer and the former director of the National Council of Educational Research and Training. After his stint as a professor at the Regional Institute of Education, Bhopal during 1974–77, he served as the principal of the institution till 1988 when he was appointed as Joint Adviser on Education to the Ministry of Human Resource Development, a post he held till 1994. When the National Council for Teacher Education (NCTE) was established in 1994, he was made the founder chairman of the council where he served until his move in 1999 to the National Council of Educational Research and Training (NCERT) as its director. He superannuated from service in 2004 and during his tenure as the head of NCERT, it was reported that he brought in regulations in BEd education by distance education method and introduced a two-year BEd course.

Rajput has published several articles and books on physics and education in English and Hindi languages; Encyclopaedia of Indian Education (2 volumes), Education in a changing world: fallacies and forces, Contemporary Concerns in Education, Universalisation of Elementary Education: Role of Teacher Education, and Teacher Education in India are some of the notable ones. UNESCO honored him with Jan Amos Comenius Medal in 2004 for his contributions to educational reforms in India and he received the Maharshi Veda Vyas Award of the Government of Madhya Pradesh in 2010. The Government of India awarded him the fourth highest civilian honour of the Padma Shri, in 2015, for his contributions to literature and education.

Selected bibliography 
 English

 
 
 
 
 
 
 
 
 
 
 
 
 

 Hindi

See also 

 National Council of Educational Research and Training
 National Council for Teacher Education

References

External links 
 *

Further reading 
 
 

Recipients of the Padma Shri in literature & education
Year of birth missing (living people)
20th-century Indian educational theorists
Indian social sciences writers
Writers from Madhya Pradesh
UNESCO officials
Scientists from Madhya Pradesh
Indian officials of the United Nations
Living people